Madeleine Achade is a Beninese politician who served as a member of the Pan-African Parliament and on the Health and Labor Finance Committee since c. 2006.

References

Living people
Members of the Pan-African Parliament from Benin
Year of birth missing (living people)